Vellampalli Srinivasa Rao is an Indian politician, currently a Member of the Legislative Assembly.

He was born in Vijayawada, Andhra Pradesh, the son of Vellampalli Suryanarayana. He was  elected as MLA in 2009 & 2019 in Andhra Pradesh. He Served as Endowments Minister in the Andhra Pradesh Government.

References

Politicians from Vijayawada
Praja Rajyam Party politicians
Bharatiya Janata Party politicians from Andhra Pradesh
Andhra Pradesh MLAs 2019–2024
YSR Congress Party politicians